Bardwell Ward is one of a number of West Suffolk District wards created to come into force following the 2019 local elections held on 2 May 2019. This was part of the 2019–2023 structural changes to local government in England.

In 2018/19 it had a population of  2,703 persons living in 1,143 dwellings. According to 2011 statistics, about 65% of these dwellings were owner-occupied.

The Ward comprises
 Bardwell parish
 Barnham parish
 Coney Weston parish
 Euston parish
 Fakenham Magna parish
 Sapiston parish
 part of Honington parish

References

West Suffolk District